The following elections occurred in the year 2011.

 Local electoral calendar 2011
 National electoral calendar 2011
 2011 United Nations Security Council election

Africa
 2011 Beninese presidential election
 2011 Beninese parliamentary election
 2011 Cape Verdean parliamentary election
 2011 Cape Verdean presidential election
 2011 Central African Republic general election
 2011 Chadian parliamentary election
 2011 Chadian presidential election
 2011 Egyptian presidential election
 2011 Ivorian parliamentary election
 2011 Liberian constitutional referendum
 2011 Liberian general election
 2011 Nigerian presidential election
 2011 Nigerian parliamentary election
 2011 Nigerien parliamentary election
 2011 Nigerien presidential election
 2011 South African municipal election
 2011 Southern Sudanese independence referendum
 2011 Ugandan general election
 2011 Zambian general election

Asia
 2011 Kyrgyzstani presidential election
 2011 Laotian parliamentary election
 2011 Laotian presidential election
 2011 Singaporean general election
 2011 Singaporean presidential election

Europe
 2011 Albanian local elections
 2011 Croatian parliamentary election
 2011 Danish parliamentary election
 2011 Estonian parliamentary election
 2011 Finnish parliamentary election
 2011 Gibraltar general election
 2011 Irish general election
 2011 Irish presidential election
 2011 Moldovan local election
 2011 Norwegian local elections
 2011 Portuguese presidential election
 2011 Spanish general election
 2011 Swiss federal election
 2011 Turkish general election

Germany
 2011 Baden-Württemberg state election
 2011 Berlin state election
 2011 Bremen state election
 2011 Hamburg state election
 2011 Mecklenburg-Vorpommern state election
 2011 Rhineland-Palatinate state election
 2011 Saxony-Anhalt state election

United Kingdom
 2011 National Assembly for Wales election
 2011 Northern Ireland Assembly election
 2011 Oldham East and Saddleworth by-election
 2011 Scottish Parliament election
 2011 United Kingdom local elections

United Kingdom local
 2011 United Kingdom local elections
 2011 Northern Ireland local elections

English local
 2011 Arun Council election
 2011 Babergh Council election
 2011 Broxbourne Council election
 2011 Broxtowe Council election
 2011 North Tyneside Council election
 2011 Preston Council election

North America

Canada

 2011 Canadian federal election
 2011 Manitoba general election
 2011 New Brunswick New Democratic Party leadership election
 2011 Progressive Conservative Party of Newfoundland and Labrador leadership election
 2011 Newfoundland and Labrador general election
 2011 Ontario general election
 2011 Saskatchewan general election

United States
 2011 United States elections
 2011 Pennsylvania state elections

United States gubernatorial
 2011 United States gubernatorial elections
 2011 Kentucky gubernatorial election
 2011 Louisiana gubernatorial election
 2011 Mississippi gubernatorial election
 Opinion polling for the 2011 United States gubernatorial elections

United States mayoral
 2011 Chicago mayoral election
 2011 Portland, Maine mayoral election

Kentucky
 2011 Kentucky Attorney General Election
 2011 Kentucky Auditor Election
 2011 Kentucky gubernatorial election
 2011 Kentucky Secretary of State Election
 2011 Kentucky state treasurer election

Oceania
 2011 Micronesian parliamentary election
 2011 Samoan general election

Australia
 2011 New South Wales state election

New Zealand
 2011 Botany by-election
 2011 New Zealand voting method referendum

New Zealand general
 2011 New Zealand general election
 50th New Zealand Parliament
 Opinion polling for the 2011 New Zealand general election

South America
 2011 Argentine general election
 2011 Falkland Islands electoral system referendum
 2011 Peruvian general election

See also

 
2011
Elections